Bother may refer to:

 Bother (song), a 2003 song by Stone Sour
 Bother! The Brain of Pooh, a one-man show